Ivaana is a Greenlandic Inuit feminine given name. It is a combination of the Greenlandic name Ivek, meaning “brood egg,” and the Greenlandic name ending -na that indicates a first name.    It has been a popular name for girls in Greenland in recent years.

Notes

Feminine given names